, is a Japanese actress, whose most internationally known work has been for director Shohei Imamura, from 1979 up to the director's final film in 2010. Baisho has also appeared in films of Akira Kurosawa. She won awards for best actress at the 10th Hochi Film Award for Love Letter and Ikiteru Uchi ga Hana nano yo Shindara Sore made yo to Sengen. She also won the award for best supporting actress at the 8th Hochi Film Award for The Geisha and at the 22nd Hochi Film Award for Tokyo Lullaby.

Private life
Her sister is actress-singer Chieko Baisho.

She was married to professional wrestler Antonio Inoki from 1971 to 1987, and together they had a daughter, Hiroko.

Partial filmography

Films
 Hitokiri (1969)
 Duel at Fort Ezo (1970)
 Sword of Fury (1973)
 The Life of Chikuzan (1977)
 Bandits vs. Samurai Squadron (1978)
 Vengeance Is Mine (1979)
 Kagemusha (1980)
 Eijanaika (1981)
 Flames of Blood (1981)
 Shomben Rider (1983)
 The Ballad of Narayama (1983)
 The Geisha (1983)
 Okinawan Boys (1983)
 The Crazy Family (1984)
 Love Letter (1985)
 Cabaret (1986)
 Women Who Do Not Divorce (1986)
 Aitsu ni Koishite (1987)
 Sure-Fire Death 4: We Will Avenge You (1987)
 Zegen (1987)
 My Phoenix (1989)
 Dreams (1990)
 Last Song (1994)
 A Last Note (1995)
 The Eel (1997)
 Tokyo Lullaby (1997)
 Toki o Kakeru Shōjo (1997)
 Solitude Point, aka Yukie (1997)
 Love Letter (1998)
 Second Chance (episode 3) (1999)
 By Player (2000)
 Turn (2001)
 Warm Water Under a Red Bridge (2001)
 11'09"01 September 11 (2002)
 Out (2002)
 Pecoross' Mother and Her Days (2013)
 Der grosse Sommer (2016)
 Sing My Life (2016)
 Threads: Our Tapestry of Love (2020), Setsuko Murata
 In the Wake (2021)
 Offbeat Cops (2022)

Television
 Tantei Monogatari (1979-1980), lawyer Masako Aiki
 Ryōmaden (2010), Iwasaki Miwa
 Anone (2018), Masako Tamegai
 Gannibal (2022), Gin Gotō

References

External links

 Baisho Mitsuko's JMDb Listing (in Japanese)
 Talent Databank profile 

Living people
20th-century Japanese actresses
21st-century Japanese actresses
Actors from Ibaraki Prefecture
Japanese film actresses
Japanese television actresses
Year of birth missing (living people)